The 2023 Arafura by-election was held on Saturday, 18 March 2023 to elect the next member of the Northern Territory Legislative Assembly for the electoral division of Arafura. The by-election was triggered by the death of incumbent Labor MP Lawrence Costa, who died on 17 December 2022 and had a state funeral held for him on 1 March. The election was won by Labor candidate Manuel Brown. Chief Minister and NT Labor leader Natasha Fyles declared victory after two hours of counting.

Background

2020 election results

Candidates

Results

Results are not final. Last updated on 20 March 2023 at 2:30pm ACDT.

References

2023 elections in Australia
Northern Territory by-elections